Public holidays in Transnistria lists the official public holidays recognized by the breakaway Transnistrian government. On these days, government offices, offices of foreign missions (such as the Organization for Security and Co-operation in Europe) and some shops, are closed. If the date of observance falls on a Saturday or Sunday, the following Monday will be a day off in lieu of the holiday.

Official holidays

Professional holidays
Day of the Diplomatic Service (10 February)
Liberation Day (12 April)
Firefighter Day (17 April)
Labor Protection Day (28 April)
State Security Day (16 May)
Museum Day (18 May)
Peacekeeper Day (28 July)
Civil Protection Day (19 August)
Armed Forces Day (6 September)
Border Guards Day (14 September)
Day of the 2006 Transnistrian independence referendum (17 September)
Police Day (10 November)
Mother's Day (27 November)

See also
Public holidays in Moldova
Public holidays in Romania

References

 
Transnistria
Politics of Transnistria
Transnistria